The Cross Lake Dolomite is a geologic formation in Manitoba. It preserves fossils dating back to the Silurian period.

See also

 List of fossiliferous stratigraphic units in Manitoba

References
 

Silurian Manitoba